Tetrix (often stylized as TETRIX) is a Canadian psychedelic rock/improvised music band formed in Calgary. The band was formed in 2001 with the intention of exploring connections between jazz, psychedelic rock, hip hop, punk rock, folk and electronic music.

The name Tetrix is derived from the popular computer game Tetris and the fractal Sierpinski triangle.  Themes of freedom (philosophy), mathematics and mysticism appear throughout the band's music.

The band has released 17 full-length albums on Calgary's Odin Audio label and a 12" compilation LP on Belgium's MeWe Le Disque Label.  Tetrix  has been featured in numerous publications including Fast Forward Weekly, Beatroute and Gauntlet in Canada, Trax magazine in France and Voxer magazine across Europe.  Tetrix has also been a strong supporter of local independent radio, and has appeared live on Calgary's CJSW 5 times in support of their funding drive.

Band members

Current
Pockett
Krock
Conman

Discography

Full length albums
 Tetrix  1 (2002)
 Tetrix  2 (2002)
 Tetrix  3 (2003)
 Tetrix  4 (2003)
 Tetrix  5 (2004)
 Tetrix  6 (2005)
 Tetrix  7 (2006)
 Tetrix  8 (2007)
 Tetrix  9 (2008)
 Tetrix  10 (2009)
 Tetrix  11 (2011)
 Tetrix  12 (2012)
 Tetrix  13 (2014)
 Tetrix  14 (2016)
Cassette Romance (2017)
Drugs in the Water (2018)
Every House Has a Light On (2019)

Compilation 12" LPs
 Tetrix  (2005)

External links
Tetrix Bandcamp page with all albums
Tetrix Official band website
March 2003 article in The Gauntlet newspaper
February 2005 article in FFWD magazine
September 2005 article in Voxer magazine
May 2006 article in FFWD magazine
May 2006 article in Beatroute magazine
June 2006 review in The Gauntlet newspaper
June 2007 article in Beatroute magazine
April 2014 article in Sound Projector magazine
Sept 2016 article in ''Sound Projector' magazine
Sept 2018 review of Drugs in the Water
Latest Canadian chart performance

Musical groups established in 2001
Musical groups from Calgary
Canadian progressive rock groups
2001 establishments in Alberta